This is a list of bus routes operated by the Washington Metropolitan Area Transit Authority (WMATA), branded as Metrobus in Washington, D.C. Many are the descendants of streetcar lines operated by the Capital Transit Company or its predecessors.

Numbering
Most Metrobus routes in DC begin with a letter followed by a number but some routes can have double digit numbers.

Odd-numbered routes are typically part-time variants of even-numbered routes. At one time, odd numbered routes were express routes, but that distinction has been abandoned. Most odd-numbered routes operates during rush hours and or limited stops with a few of them running into the off peak hours and weekends.

History
Many current routes operate under former streetcar routes. The streetcars provided the main transportation in the Washington, D.C. area from the 1800s to the 1960s. DC Transit would also operate on the former streetcar routes when the Streetcars ended service. In 1973, WMATA acquired DC Transit along with other bus companies to form its current Metrobus system.

Due to the COVID-19 pandemic, service has been mostly reduced to Sunday service schedules during the weekdays with select routes suspended from March 18 until August 22, 2020. Routes 54, 70, 90, A6, A8, B2, H4, S4, V4, W4, and X2 were the only routes that ran during the weekends with the rest of the routes suspended. On August 23, 2020, more routes came back during the weekdays and weekends returning Metrobus service to 75%.

Routes
Most DC Metrobus routes operate inside the Washington DC borders. However, some routes would venture into small parts of Montgomery County and Prince George's County to connect to various stations in the Hub-and-spoke system via the old Streetcar routing.

School Routes
These routes connect schools to Washington Metro stations or other local points. They are primarily intended for students, but are open to anyone, and stop at all stops along their routes. These routes will only operate when District of Columbia Public Schools are open.

Additional trips are added to the following routes during school hours: 62, 90, A2, A7, B2, H4, K2, M4, P6, U6, W1, W4, X2.

Routes History
This table gives background knowledge of how routes were created and the overall changes it has gone through the years.

Former Routes
These routes have been served by Metrobus at one point but have since been discontinued due to either low ridership, duplication of another route, simplification to other routes, combined into another route, low funding, or transferred to another bus company as it would be cheaper to maintain cost and for another carrier to operate the line. However some routes would be reincarnated into new routes for Metrobus. Examples of reincarnations were the 34, V7, and V8.

See also 
 List of Metrobus routes (Washington, D.C.)
 List of Metrobus routes in Maryland
 List of Metrobus routes in Virginia

References

External Links 
 District of Columbia Timetables

Routes
Washington D.C.
Bus routes, Washington